Ian Scott Holloway (born 12 March 1963) is an English professional football manager, former player, media personality and television pundit who was most recently the manager of Grimsby Town.

A midfielder, he notably played in the Premier League with Queens Park Rangers where he made just under 150 league appearances in a five-year spell. He spent most of his career at boyhood club Bristol Rovers where he had three spells which included the start and finish of his playing career. He was part of the Wimbledon team that won promotion to the top flight in 1986, a place they would remain for the next fourteen seasons. He also played in the Football League with Brentford and Torquay United.

During his third spell back at Bristol Rovers, he became player-manager before ending his playing career in 1999. He has also managed Queens Park Rangers (where he won promotion from Division Two in 2003–04), Plymouth Argyle, Leicester City, Blackpool, Crystal Palace and Millwall. As he did with Blackpool three years earlier, Holloway managed Crystal Palace to promotion to the Premier League in May 2013, but after the club had won only one of their opening eight games he left, by mutual consent, on 23 October 2013 after less than a year in charge. On 6 January 2014, Holloway signed a two-and-a-half-year deal with Millwall; this was terminated in March 2015. He rejoined Queens Park Rangers as manager on 11 November 2016. In December 2019, he joined Grimsby Town as a manager and club director after committing to purchase shares in the club. He resigned just under a year later.

He is known by the nickname "Ollie", which is also the title of his autobiography. Holloway has a reputation amongst football fans for his West Country accent, off-the-wall interviews and amusing answers to questions from the media, with a wide selection of quotes and soundbites being printed.

Playing career

A native of Kingswood, near Bristol, Holloway grew up in Cadbury Heath, where his mother, Jean, lived in the same council house until her death in April 2018. Holloway went to Sir Bernard Lovell School in Oldland Common at the same time that Gary Penrice was at Chase School for Boys in Mangotsfield. They still remain close friends today. His father Bill – an amateur footballer – worked as a seaman and a factory worker.

Holloway began his playing career as an apprentice with his hometown team Bristol Rovers, turning professional in March 1981 and making his league debut the same year. He usually played on the right side of midfield, and made his name as one of the more promising players in the Third Division (now League One). After four seasons at Rovers, he was transferred to Wimbledon in July 1985 for £35,000.

Holloway's stay at Wimbledon was a short one. In March 1986, after less than one year at the club, he was sold to Brentford for £25,000, where he also spent just a little over a year. In January 1987 he joined Torquay United on loan, playing five times. In August 1987, after two years in London, Holloway returned to Bristol Rovers for a fee of £10,000.

Back at Rovers, who were now playing "home" games at Twerton Park in Bath, and under the wing of new Rovers manager Gerry Francis, Holloway flourished. In four seasons, he missed only five games. When Francis was appointed manager of First Division side QPR in 1991, one of his first signings was Holloway, for a fee of £230,000 in August 1991. Holloway spent five seasons at QPR, playing more than 150 games for the club, before returning to Bristol Rovers for the third time in August 1996, this time as player-manager.

Managerial career

Bristol Rovers
Holloway took over a club that was struggling both on and off the pitch. In his first season in charge of Rovers, he led the club to 17th place in Division Two (now League One). The next season, however, Bristol Rovers gained fifth place and made the playoffs. Despite taking a first-leg advantage of 3–1 against Northampton Town, Rovers subsequently lost 3–0 in the second leg and went out 4–3 on aggregate in the semi-finals. The 1998–99 season ended with a somewhat disappointing 13th place. Holloway retired as a player following that season, having played more than 400 matches for Bristol Rovers, to concentrate fully on management. In 1999–2000, his last full season at the club, Rovers finished 7th, narrowly missing the playoffs.

Queens Park Rangers
In February 2001, midway through the 2000–01 season, Holloway was appointed manager of QPR, where he was given the task of keeping the team in Division One. He failed to do so, as QPR finished second from bottom and were relegated to the third level for the first time in 34 years. Despite the relegation, Holloway stayed on and rebuilt the side. After steadying the ship in 2001–02, and a near miss in 2002–03, Holloway and QPR were promoted back to the second level in 2004, finishing second behind Plymouth Argyle.

Holloway's first full season in The Championship ended with a respectable 11th place, and during the following season 2005–06, the club continued to hover around mid-table.

Holloway was suspended (sent on gardening leave) as manager by Queens Park Rangers on 6 February 2006. The reason given by the QPR board was that the constant rumours linking Holloway to the vacant managerial position at Leicester City were causing too many problems for the club. As it turned out, the Leicester job went to Rob Kelly, and QPR went on to finish 21st, just one place above the relegation positions.

Plymouth Argyle

On 28 June 2006, Holloway became the manager of Plymouth Argyle, and promised to take the club to the Premier League. On 12 August, after Plymouth beat Sunderland away 2–3, in celebration of his first away win as manager, Holloway offered to buy every one of the 700 fans who made the  round trip a drink: "Anyone who travelled up there please send me a letter. I would love to buy you a drink."

Following press speculation, on 21 November 2007, Holloway submitted his resignation to the Plymouth Argyle board, with speculation that he was about to be offered the vacant managerial position at Leicester City. The Plymouth board issued a statement saying he was still employed by Plymouth and tied legally to his contract, and the board's decision on whether or not to accept his resignation would be made on Friday, 23 November. Having agreed a compensation package for his services, he was announced in a press conference by Milan Mandarić as Leicester manager on 22 November, signing a -year contract. His departure, however, was met with negativity from Argyle fans.

After an open top bus tour in Blackpool, after his Blackpool side won promotion to the Premier League some three years later, Holloway said:

Leicester City
Holloway made history when he became the first Leicester manager in over 50 years to win his first league game in charge, beating Bristol City 2–0.

On 7 February 2008, in a buildup to a match against Plymouth at the Walkers Stadium, Argyle chairman Paul Stapleton spoke negatively of Holloway for allowing several high-profile players to leave the club before joining Leicester. A total of five players left Plymouth in the January transfer window, which he claimed was all Holloway's fault. Holloway, stunned by the claims, had his lawyers look at the statements, while Mandarić accused Stapleton of "sour grapes" over Holloway's move to Leicester, saying Plymouth Argyle should be thankful for what he had achieved during his time there. Plymouth won the match 1–0 as Holloway's former charges came back to haunt him. Winning just nine out of 32 games, Leicester were relegated from the Championship on 4 May 2008 entering for the first time ever in their, then one hundred and twenty four-year, history the third tier of English football. Leicester City being up to that time one of only a handful (nine) of English teams that had never been out of the first two tiers of English football.

On 23 May 2008, following the club's relegation, Holloway and Leicester City parted company by mutual consent. Reflecting on his time at Leicester, he said "Leicester City is a marvellous club and I am as devastated as anybody that this great club suffered relegation. I gave 100% to the cause but unfortunately we ran out of time. The fans here are a different class and deserve a lot, lot better. I'd like to wish everyone connected with Leicester City well for the future – the club will always remain close to my heart."

Blackpool

On 21 May 2009, it was reported that Holloway, after 364 days out of football, was set to be announced as the new manager of Blackpool following the departure of their caretaker manager Tony Parkes. The appointment was confirmed later the same day with Holloway signing a one-year contract with the club. His first league game in charge of the Seasiders was a 1–1 draw with his former club Queens Park Rangers at Loftus Road on 8 August 2009, the opening day of the 2009–10 season. Nine months later, he guided the club to the Premier League after winning the play-offs following a sixth-placed finish in The Championship, becoming only the second Blackpool manager (after Les Shannon in 1970) to win promotion in his first full season. Holloway described the achievement as the best moment of his life, aside from seeing his children born. Holloway followed this up in late July by leading Blackpool to victory in the South West Challenge Cup annual pre-season tournament. It was the first time a Premier League club had taken part.

Before the start of Blackpool's first top-flight season in 40 years, media reports suggested that Holloway was set to resign as manager following an alleged dispute with club chairman Karl Oyston. However, at a press conference held at Bloomfield Road on 11 August to announce the arrival of four new players, Holloway swiftly denied the rumours, describing his relationship with Oyston as "absolutely fantastic". And adding:

The following day it was reported that Holloway had signed a new two-year contract.

On 27 January 2011, the Premier League fined Blackpool £25,000 for fielding what they believed to be a weakened team against Aston Villa on 10 November 2010. Holloway, who initially threatened to resign if punishment was dealt, made ten changes to the team for the fixture. Holloway was made aware of the fine over the phone while playing golf with his wife at Shawhill Golf Club in Chorley. He offered his resignation to Karl Oyston, but it was rejected.

On 22 May 2011, Blackpool lost their Premier League status after losing 4–2 to champions Manchester United at Old Trafford, coupled with results elsewhere, and returned to The Championship after one season.

Holloway marked his century of games in charge of Blackpool with a victory, the 37th of his reign, over Ipswich Town at Bloomfield Road on 10 September 2011.

In May 2012, Holloway guided Blackpool into The Championship play-offs for the second time in as many seasons in the division. They lost 2–1 to West Ham in the play-off final.

Holloway's win percentage in League games as Blackpool manager was 37.8% (54 wins from 143 games).

Crystal Palace
On 3 November 2012, Holloway agreed to join Crystal Palace as manager, although caretaker manager Curtis Fleming remained in charge of the team for the match on that day. He took charge of his first game on 6 November, which Crystal Palace won 5–0 against Ipswich Town. On 27 May 2013, Holloway guided Crystal Palace to promotion to the 2013–14 Premier League after beating Watford 1-0 through a penalty converted by Kevin Philips in extra time.

In the 2013–14 Premier League season, Crystal Palace started with just three points from the first eight games as Holloway came under pressure to keep his job.

On 23 October 2013, after a 4–1 loss against Fulham, Holloway left the club by mutual consent after less than a year in charge.

Millwall
On 7 January 2014, he signed two-and-a-half-year contract with Millwall. He then guided the club to Championship safety for the 2013–14 season as Millwall finished 19th, four points above the relegation places. In the 2014–15 season, as Millwall dropped in the relegation places in The Championship, Holloway admitted that he had become an unpopular manager among Millwall fans. On 10 March 2015, following a 4–1 defeat at home to Norwich City, Holloway was sacked for the first time in his managerial career, with the team second from bottom in the Championship and having lost five of their last six games.

Return to Queens Park Rangers
On 11 November 2016, Holloway was appointed as manager of Queens Park Rangers for a second spell replacing Jimmy Floyd Hasselbaink. He left the club on 10 May 2018.

Grimsby Town
On 29 December 2019, Holloway joined Grimsby Town as manager, at the same time he became committed to becoming a shareholder in the club confirming he would be purchasing £100,000 of shares, this would allow him to attend board meetings in addition to his duties as club manager, with Holloway being appointed as a director in the process. The Mariners enjoyed an initial resurgence under Holloway and they won their first two games under him with a 1–0 win at home to Salford City followed by a 1–0 win away at Mansfield Town the following week. Holloway made a host of signings that included his former Blackpool players Billy Clarke and Elliot Grandin. On 7 March 2020 the side played out their final game of the season with a 2–0 win away at local rivals Scunthorpe United before the season was cut short and ended early due to the COVID-19 pandemic.

In February 2020, majority shareholder John Fenty announced he was going to be taking a step back and allowing Holloway more freedom and autonomy to run the club both on and off the field. Holloway made wholesale changes to the Grimsby side over the summer which included seven loan signings, despite only having the ability to name five in a match day squad. On 22 November 2020, following a 5–0 defeat against Tranmere Rovers, Holloway announced he had released one of his recent signings Bilel Mohsni despite recently stating "he is my leader, he is my Virgil van Dijk". Mohsni despite not playing in the 5–0 defeat was confirmed released as he did not meet Holloway's standards, this prompted Mohsni to set up a Twitter account and post a video to announce that he had not left the club, was still contracted, feeling fit and would be at training the next day. The following day, Holloway said that he thought the termination had been agreed and that it was not his concern whether the player remained at the club until January. Mohsni signed for Barnet on 1 December 2020.

On 17 December 2020, it was discovered by the Grimsby Telegraph that John Fenty had entertained Manchester-based convicted fraudster Alex May at a Grimsby Town game, with May looking to invest £1 million into the club. However, with the news of his offer on the table it was met with strong resistance by fans leading to the deal to be turned down by the club. Unrelated to the May offer, but during the same week the club had also confirmed it had met with a consortium of local businessmen fronted by London-based Tom Shutes about a potential takeover. Holloway hit out at the consortium by saying that he was finding it increasingly hard to do his job. He also announced he was backing away from his director duties to concentrate on his position as manager and would be using social media more often to communicate with supporters, claiming also that he would not be going anywhere unless told so.

It was also announced that Holloway had not yet invested any money into the club like first thought, and that this investment would now only be made upon the sale of his house in Bristol. Following Grimsby's 1–0 victory over Scunthorpe United on 19 December 2020 he stated that he would not be going ahead with plans to invest any of his money in the club due to the on-going discussions in the boardroom and continuing talks of a takeover.

On the morning of 23 December 2020, just hours after Grimsby's 1–2 home defeat to Bradford City, Holloway resigned as Grimsby Town manager releasing a statement using his Twitter account. He had been in charge just under a year, leaving them 20th in League Two with only five wins from nineteen games. His reason for departing was his displeasure at John Fenty's decision to sell his shares in the club, claiming he did not want to carry on at the club without the people he came here to work with. Holloway also stated that a key factor in his departure was that the potential consortium interested in buying the club had reached out to him and contacted him several times and he found this to be inappropriate; although a statement later released by the potential investment group denied that any of them had ever had any contact with Holloway and stated  "Several weeks ago, we did make it clear through a mutual friend that we were very supportive of Ian and that if we were to take over as custodians of the club we wanted to build a legacy with him in place (which we also communicated to Philip Day in our discussions over the last week)." The group also expressed surprise and disappointment at his resignation. Later that day Fenty officially rejected a potential takeover over bid from the consortium, although terms were finally agreed on 29 December 2020 to sell the club to Jason Stockwood and Andrew Pettit, members of the Shutes consortium.

Grimsby would replace Holloway temporarily with his assistant Ben Davies who following the club's next game, commented "I had a good chat with him, and everything was okay. We went into the game against Bradford on Tuesday night, and he came in the next morning and said he'd resigned. Obviously it's hard to take when you get close to someone over the last year or so, but that's the way it goes." 

Since his resignation, Holloway has drawn criticism in both the nature of his departure and the state and quality of the team that he had put together during the summer, with the squad he left behind bloated in numbers and lacking in quality. On 29 January, Holloway stated that he had left the club in a better position than when he arrived, this is despite the club being in embroiled in a relegation battle with a squad that seemed destined for relegation.

On 12 January 2021, Grimsby Town became the first football club in England to be fined for breaking COVID-19 protocol after it was revealed that Holloway had played darts with some of his players at the club's training ground.

On 27 April 2021, Grimsby were relegated back to non-League for a second time, former Mariners player and BBC Humberside co-commentator Gary Croft blamed Holloway: "He's done miles more than me in the game, Ian Holloway, but I feel like it was just a bit of a play thing, a toy for him to play with. I just can't believe that people have stood around and watched it happen, watched it unfurl without getting into him, questioning him, and finding out what's going on. He was like that all-powerful person that no-one dare question. Crazy interviews that once were entertaining YouTube viewing, and are now completely not funny. He's come here and turned this season into a disaster. I don't think this is a particularly strong league, I don't think Town needed to do an awful lot, and for a club of our size in this league, we shouldn't be down where we are."

Future
Following his initial departure from Grimsby, Holloway went on to state that he was unsure whether he would return to football management again, saying his appetite for football has diminished.

In a podcast interview in late 2022, Holloway blamed his Grimsby departure on the COVID-19 pandemic and the fact that his scouting network was not suited to operate at League Two level. He also stated he would be interested in a return to management but only at EFL Championship level.

In February 2023, Holloway applied for and was interviewed for the vacancy at Scottish Premiership side Motherwell, although the board eventually chose Stuart Kettlewell.

Personal life
Holloway met fellow Bristolian Kim when they were both aged 15, and after marrying, he nursed her through lymphatic cancer. The couple have four children: William, twins Eve and Chloe, and Harriet. The twins were born profoundly deaf, as both Ian and Kim had a recessive form of a certain gene meaning that there was a higher chance that they would have deaf children. The doctors told them that there was only a remote possibility of any other children being deaf, but Harriet was also born deaf. Talking about his children, Holloway said: "it's been a fight all the way along to get proper provision for the girls, especially a good education. There's been rows, tribunals, appeals and endless phone calls. We have been labelled as bolshie parents. My view is that every child in the world has the right to be educated properly and whether your eyes or ears don't work is irrelevant. But the system at the moment makes it difficult."

For the last three years of his QPR career, Holloway commuted daily from Bristol to London, a 250-mile round trip, so the children could attend a deaf school in Bristol. As a result, he developed severe sciatica. They then moved to St Albans when the children were of secondary school age, for the same reason. Holloway has learned sign language, and his quirky media-friendly quotes have made him a high-profile campaigner on deaf issues and concerns.

Holloway on his children:

During the gap between leaving Leicester and his appointment as Blackpool manager, Holloway became involved with the self-sufficiency movement, acquiring a brood of chickens and learning sufficient carpentry to build what he described as "Orpington Manor". When he moved north after taking over at Blackpool, the family brought with them their 33 chickens, three horses, two dogs and two ducks. After they settled into their home near Pendle Hill, Blackpool's groundsman, Stan Raby, gave them seven turkeys.

On the 20th October 2020, during the post-match interview Ollie revealed that that day had been "one of the worst days of my life". He revealed that he'd learnt of the suicide of one of his best friends earlier in the day.

Members of 'The Fishy', A Grimsby Town fan forum, started a fundraiser to raise money in support of Holloway, in a show of loyal support for him. The fundraiser had donations from all across the globe, as well as many donations from supporters of clubs that he had previously managed. The final total raised was £6,686.85, of which Holloway donated it to two charities suggested by the family of his friend.

Media career
Holloway is well known for his comments in post-match interviews, which are often quoted in the national media. His creative use of metaphors has made him one of the most popular interviewees and one of the cult personalities in English football. In June 2005 a book of his quotes, "Let's Have Coffee: The Tao of Ian Holloway", was published; and in June 2006 he came 15th in a Time Out poll of funniest Londoners.

His autobiography, Ollie: The Autobiography of Ian Holloway, co-written with David Clayton, was first published in 2007, with an update in 2009. In August 2008 the Little Book of Ollie'isms was published, also co-written with David Clayton. Holloway also wrote the foreword for The Official Bristol Rovers Quiz Book, published in November 2008.

Holloway is an Honorary Patron of the anti-racist organisation Show Racism the Red Card. He attended an educational event at Bloomfield Road in 2009 along with then Blackpool club captain Jason Euell, who had just recently been the victim of racist abuse. The pair attended the event and sat on a panel to share their opinions and experiences of racism with the audience of young people.

For the 2010–11 season, Holloway agreed to write a weekly column for The Independent on Sunday. For the 2012–13 campaign, he wrote for the Sunday Mirror. Holloway cited, in an interview to BBC programme Football Focus, that part of his decision to move to Crystal Palace was to be closer to family following the expectation of his first grandchild.

During breaks in his managerial career, Holloway has often appeared as a television pundit on EFL on Quest with Colin Murray. In 2019 he also began his own podcast named "The Ian Holloway Podcast". The podcast was put on hold whilst he spent time as the manager of Grimsby Town but following his departure he announced he was resuming his show and asked for questions to feature on his next broadcast by posting on his Twitter account. The post went viral when supporters of Grimsby Town began sarcastically asking him darts related questions in reference to his game of darts at the training field that caused the club to be fined by the EFL for breaking COVID-19 protocol, other fans also voiced their displeasure at the nature of his departure from the club and the lack of quality in the team he left behind.

Managerial statistics

Honours

Player
Bristol Rovers
Football League Third Division: 1989–90

Wimbledon
Football League Second Division promotion: 1985–86

Manager
Queen's Park Rangers
Football League Second Division promotion: 2003–04

Blackpool
Football League Championship play-off winner: 2009–10

Crystal Palace
Football League Championship play-off winner: 2012–13

Individual
Football League Championship Manager of the Month: September 2004, August 2012
Football League Second Division Manager of the Month: February 2003, November 2003

Bibliography
Little Book of Ollie'isms (2008)
Ollie: The Autobiography of Ian Holloway (2009)

Further reading

References

External links

1963 births
Living people
People from Kingswood, South Gloucestershire
Sportspeople from Gloucestershire
English footballers
Association football midfielders
Brentford F.C. players
Bristol Rovers F.C. players
Queens Park Rangers F.C. players
Torquay United F.C. players
Wimbledon F.C. players
English Football League players
Premier League players
English football managers
Bristol Rovers F.C. managers
Queens Park Rangers F.C. managers
Plymouth Argyle F.C. managers
Leicester City F.C. managers
Blackpool F.C. managers
Crystal Palace F.C. managers
Millwall F.C. managers
Grimsby Town F.C. managers
Grimsby Town F.C. non-playing staff
English Football League managers
Premier League managers
English autobiographers
English association football commentators